Harpalus flavicornis is a species of ground beetle in the subfamily Harpalinae. It was first described by Pierre François Marie Auguste Dejean in 1829.

References

flavicornis
Beetles described in 1829